Sheng ji is a family of point-based, trick-taking card games played in China and in Chinese immigrant communities. They have a dynamic trump, i.e., which cards are trump changes every round. As these games are played over a wide area with no standardization, rules vary widely from region to region.

The game can be played with multiple decks of cards. With one deck, it may be called dǎ bǎi fēn ('competing for a hundred points') or sìshí fēn ('forty points'); with two decks, as is most commonly played, it may be called bāshí fēn ('eighty points'), tuō lā jī ('tractor'),  shuāng kōu ('double digging out'), or shuāng shēng ('double upgrade'); another variant is called zhǎo péngyǒu ('Finding Friends'), which has five or more players and two or more decks.

The article below mainly describes the bashi fen variant, with players playing with two decks and in fixed partnerships.

Players and objective
The game is played with four players in fixed partnerships, with players sitting across each other forming a team. Each team has a rank that they are currently playing, henceforth referred to as their score. At the beginning of a match, everyone starts at a score of 2.

The teams are divided into the "declarers" (also known as "defenders") and the "opponents" (also known as "attackers"), which are determined in the process of the game and will change frequently (see below). Ultimately, the purpose of the game is to raise one's own team to the score of above ace, while preventing the other team from doing so.

When a team passes (rather than exactly attains) a score of ace, a match usually ends with their victory. This may take several hours, so shorter games may end at a lower threshold, or begin with players' scores higher than two. If an even longer game is desired, players can wrap back around to 2 after passing ace.

The deck
The game is played with two decks, with two jokers per deck, giving a total of four jokers. The jokers are separated into red and black (or colloquially known as "big" and "small" respectively). Some card manufacturers will make jokers of the same color, which then have to be marked as "red" and "black."

The order of the cards depends on the dominant suit and rank, which are determined before every round. The typical order, from highest to lowest, is:
 Red jokers
 Black jokers
 Cards in both the dominant suit and rank
 Other cards in the dominant rank, equally ranked
 Other cards in the dominant suit, following the descending order ace through 2
 Cards in other suits, following the descending order ace through 2

where the first five are categorized under the trump suit. For example, in a certain round, if the seven of clubs (7) is dominant, then the order of the cards is:
 Red jokers
 Black jokers
 7♣ 
 Seven of any other suit
 A♣, K♣, Q♣, J♣, 10♣, 9♣, 8♣, 6♣, 5♣, 4♣, 3♣, 2♣
 Cards in other suits, following the order ace, king, queen (excluding 7), etc., down to 2.

Note that the other sevens are no longer considered members of their respective suit, but part of the trump suit; the red jokers are equally ranked with each other, and so are the black jokers, sevens of clubs, and sevens of other suits.

If two or more equally ranked cards or combinations are played during a trick, the first one played wins.

Point cards
In the deck, all kings and 10s are worth 10 points each, while 5s are worth 5 points each, although the presence of the points do not affect the order of the cards. In two decks, there are a total of 200 points. All other cards do not contain points.

For the opponents, the goal of each round is to obtain 80 points or more in one round to become declarers in the next round, while for the declarers, it would be preventing the opponents from obtaining 80 points, and thus raising their team's rank.

Dealing
The cards are dealt out in Chinese fashion, where the players take turns drawing one card at a time in counter-clockwise order. The deal is initiated in one of two ways:

 One player shuffles the cards and lets any other player cut, then draws the first card.
 One player shuffles the cards, then turns over one of them.  He then counts, starting from himself and going counter-clockwise, until he reaches the number equivalent to the card, where aces count as one, jacks as 11, queens as 12, and kings as 13. If the card turned over is a joker, another card must be turned over. The player who is reached draws the first card after the player to his left cuts.

Determining declarers and dealers
The dealer is a member of the declarers' team that starts every round, and plays an important role in helping his team increase their rank in that round. The dealer is usually determined as such:

 In the first round, every team starts at rank of 2. For teams are not separated into declarers or opponents yet, players should reveal any 2 card from the cards he drew as quickly as possible; the first to do so will instantly become the dealer. His team will thus become the declarers while the other team will become the opponents.
 In subsequent rounds, if the declarers have defended their points in the previous round, they will remain as declarers, but the partner of the previous dealer will become the new dealer. If the opponents have caught 80 points, they will become the new declarers, with the player sitting on the right of the previous dealer becoming the new dealer.

Determining the dominant suit and rank
The dominant rank is always equal to the score of the declarers in any particular round. Hence, when the declarers obtain a score of 5, the rank for that round is 5; when the score is raised to 7, the rank is 7, and so on.

The dominant suit, on the other hand, is determined during the drawing of cards where any player decides to reveal a card in the trump rank he has, and the suit of the card becomes the trump suit.

 In cases where players do not agree to the dominant suit set, they may play doubles of another suit in the same rank to cancel the original declaration, making the new suit the dominant suit. 
 E.g. The dominant rank is 9. Player North reveals a 9 to make hearts dominant, but Player East then reveals a pair of 9♣, effectively cancelling North's declaration and making clubs the dominant suit.
 In order to prevent this, North may reveal another 9 before East's declaration to secure the declaration of Hearts as the dominant suit.
 In certain cases, where no player decides to reveal a card to determine the dominant suit, then the first card in the kitty  is turned over, and its suit is adopted as the dominant suit. If the card turned over is a joker, there is 3 methods of it:
 turn over the subsequent card
 play no-trumps round
 reshuffle the cards
In other variations, the cards in the kitty are continuously turned over until the trump rank appears, in which that suit is the trump and no more cards are flipped. If no cards of the trump rank appear, the biggest card's suit is trump, or if two cards are tied for biggest, then the one flipped first is declared the trump suit.
 In some variations, players may reveal 2 of the same jokers(eg: black joker, black joker) to declare no-trump rounds, where there is no dominant suit and the trump suit will only consist of the jokers and the eight cards of the trump rank (all equally ordered).

Concluding the deal
Drawing continues until everyone has drawn 25 cards and a pool of reserve cards (usually consisting of about eight cards), remains. The dealer then picks up all the cards, integrates them into his hand, and then discards the same number of cards into a pile in the center, known as the kitty. These cards are kept unopened throughout the duration of that round and may or may not be turned over thereafter, depending on the result of the last trick in the round.

Sometimes, a player who has no trump, or, in other variations, no point cards in his hand, may force a redeal by showing his hand to everyone.

Play
The dealer leads the first trick with any single card or combinations of cards, and the game proceeds like most trick-taking games, where players take turn to play their cards in a counter-clockwise direction, and the player who plays the highest-ordered card or combination of cards take the trick and leads the next round. All cards taken by the declarers may be discarded for the rest of the round; point cards taken by the opponents count towards their number of points collected, and should be kept, but other cards may be similarly discarded.

A lead may be of one of four types, each with different rules dealing with what can be played on it. As a rule of thumb, when any card or combination of cards is lead, other players must always follow the number of card(s) played.

Single or double cards(Pair)
Any single card may be lead. Players must follow suit if they have cards in the same suit; if a trump card is lead, other players must play a trump card, if they still have any. The highest trump, or, if no trump is played, the highest-ordered card of the suit lead takes the trick. In case of ties, the first highest card played wins the trick.

Only two  cards are considered doubles(Or Pair), so two different-suited trump rank cards, two ordinary non-trump cards with the same value, or a combination of a red joker and a black joker are not counted. For example, if 7♣ is trump, 7♠-7, or Q♠-Q are not considered doubles despite them being of equal rank (or in the first case, both in the trump suit).

After a double-cards lead, other players must also follow suit with double cards, if they have them; for players who do not have double cards in the suit lead, they must play separate cards in the same suit if they have them. Only after playing any cards in the lead suit, they may play any cards from other suits, or a double from the trump suit to "ruff" the trick. In this case, the highest-ordered trump double, if it is played, wins the trick; otherwise, the highest-ordered double in the suit lead wins. Two singles may not beat a double even if they are both higher-ordered than the double (for trump 7♣, 9-9 beats J-Q or even J♣-Q♣, if a diamond double was led).

Consecutive double cards(Tractor)
If a player has consecutive pairs of cards(or Tractor) in the same suit (trump or non-trump), he or she may lead it as a group. In this case, other players must follow suit by playing cards according to the following priority, if they have them:

 Other consecutive doubles(Tractor) in the same suit
 Other doubles in the same suit
 Other singles in the same suit

The first combination, if all consecutive and of a greater order than the suit lead, wins the trick. Only when a player does not have any other card in the suit played, then he is allowed to play cards of other suits, or ruff the combination with the same number of consecutive pairs in the trump suit.

The table below describes whether some combinations are considered as consecutive doubles; if otherwise, but will instead follow the multiple-cards combination rules .

Combination of multiple cards
A player may lead a combination of multiple cards(甩牌) if he has them, provided that each of the singles or doubles played are the largest in the suit and no other player has larger combinations in that round. Leading such combinations usually result in the leading player's favour.

If any card(s) in the combination may be bested by another player in the suit lead, he will be asked, by that player, to take back the cards that are the largest in the suit, and play any of the single/double/Tractor cards that may be bested as penalty.
Any non-trump combinations played are subjected to be bested (ruffed) by trump cards played by other players. Combinations ruffed do not require taking back of cards, but this is not guaranteed (see rule 1 above). 
Any single trump card or trump doubles may, respectively, beat a single card or double cards in the combination. 
Consecutive non-trump doubles may only be ruffed by consecutive trump doubles.
Any combinations with cards that are not trump, yet do not follow the suit lead may not take the trick.

Scoring
At the end of a round, all points taken by the opponents are collected and counted, while other cards may be discarded. The last trick of that round is also taken into consideration:

If the declarers win the last round, then the point count ends there.
If the opponents win the last round, then the pile of 8 cards in the kitty is turned over, and any points in there are multiplied through the table below. and added to the opponents' point count (hence allowing the point count to increase above 200):

In total, if the opponents capture 80 points or more, then they become the new declarers, and the other team becomes the opponents.

The results of the opponents' point count determine the change of scores or dealers as such:

Thereafter, all cards are recollected and shuffled, and the next round thus begins.

Variants

Number of decks played
The game may also be played with single or multiple deck, in which the number of cards in the kitty and the number of points as criteria for increasing ranks need to be revalued.

For single decks, it is typical to use 6 cards for the kitty (each player being dealt 12 cards each in a deck of 54 cards) and 40 points as the requirement to swap teams, and no double cards will be played, but combinations of cards may still be allowed. This variant is commonly known as "forty points" or "competing over a hundred points".

For multiple decks, the kitty size varies across regions. 40 is usually used as the point requirement to swap teams, and the rule of combinations may still apply, but exceptions are only granted to full -tuples (e.g. with three decks, doubles are still subject to the rule of combinations and players will have to take back their cards where necessary).

Other variants

Spin-offs of bashi fen include zhao pengyou, where five players play with two decks in fluid partnerships, with rules similar to that of fluid-partner Bridge. In this case, the dealer may call a particular card, and its owner will be his partner. The playing rules stay largely the same.

Miscellaneous optional rules
 In some variations, the playing of certain scores, especially scores involving point cards, might be mandatory and cannot be skipped. For example, if 10 is mandatory and a team goes up 2 ranks after playing 9, they will have to play 10 first, instead of going straight to jack.
 Sometimes, other players can change the trump after the dealer has discarded the kitty, and change the kitty again. This variation is called chao dipi,  'bidding for the land'.
 In some variations, the number of cards used by the opponents to win the last trick determines the factor which the points in the kitty are multiplied by; if the opponents won the last trick with doubles, the points would be quadrupled, while if the last trick is won with a combination of three cards, then the points would increase sixfold, and so on.
 When jacks (or aces) are the dominant rank, and the opponents' team wins the last trick with a J (or an A, respectively), the scores of the members of the declarers' team go back to 2 (or J). This is also called "hook and needle" because of the shapes of J and A. The players whose rank goes down is called as being "hooked back" or "needled back".
 The 5 and sometimes also the 5 may be taken as the highest cards, i.e. hong wu, 'red five'. If a trick containing one or more red 5s (or 5 only, depending on variant) is won by the opposing team, the player whose red 5 is captured is penalized.

See also
Dou di zhu
Four color cards
Gnau
Tien len
Zi pai
Wild escape

External links
 
 Finding Friends (Zhao Pengyou) rules in English
 Differences between the Chinese card game "Tractor" and Bridge

Chinese card games
Four-player card games
Point-trick games
Year of introduction missing